Roger Pierre (30 August 1923 – 23 January 2010) was a French comedian and actor.

Early life
Roger Pierre was born on 30 August 1923 in Paris, France.

Career
Pierre and Jean-Marc Thibault were one of France's most popular comedy acts. Working regularly throughout the 1950s, 60s, and 70s, Pierre's first film was 1953's "Belle mentalité (Wonderful Mentality). He appeared  in such comedies as Mary Mary (1963), Who Is This Woman? (1967), The Sole Heir (1980), Mr Masure (1987), The Night of Barbizon and The Tureen (2001).

In 1973, Pierre and Thibault starred in the 1973 comedic television series , which parodied the 1972 TV adaptation of Les Rois maudits.

Death
Pierre died in his native Paris, aged 86, from cancer.

Partial filmography

1946: Le Père tranquille - (uncredited)
1949: I Like Only You - Un journaliste d'Ici Paris (uncredited)
1952: Crazy for Love - Jean Marco, l'imprésario
1953: Deux de l'escadrille - Lt. Chardonneret
1953: Women of Paris - Himself - Comédien en duo
1953: Wonderful Mentality - Frédo
1953: Une vie de garçon - Bernard Chapuis
1953: His Father's Portrait - Le présentateur (uncredited)
1955: M'sieur la Caille - Pépé la Vache
1955: Madelon - Le caporal Georges Beauguitte
1956: La Bande à papa - Roger
1956: La vie est belle - Roger
1957: Nous autres à Champignol - Un garde
1957: C'est arrivé à 36 chandelles - Himself (uncredited)
1958: Vive les vacances - Roger
1958: Sans famille - Le clown Bib
1959: Les motards - Roger - un grand adolescent, chef d'une bande de motards du dimanche
1959: Le gendarme de Champignol - Vittorio - le bandit de la colline aux oiseaux
1960: Les héritiers - Roger
1960: Love and the Frenchwoman - Prince Charming (segment "Adolescence, L'")
1960: Les Tortillards - Gérard Durand
1961: La Belle Américaine - Le snob à la Cad' / Snob in Sports Car
1962: Un cheval pour deux - Maurice
1962: Virginie - Pierre
1962: How to Succeed in Love  - Marcel
1962: Tartarin de Tarascon - Le scout #1
1962: We Will Go to Deauville - Mr. Louis
1964: Les durs à cuire ou Comment supprimer son prochain sans perdre l'appétit - Germain Lormond
1964: Les gros bras - Philippe Bareil
1965: Les baratineurs - Philippe, un aubergiste
1966: Les malabars sont au parfum - François
1969: Faites donc plaisir aux amis - Jean-Louis Brunel
1969: Le débutant - Le scénariste
1970: Des vacances en or - Alexandre
1974: Gross Paris - Bernard
1974: En grandes pompes - Marcel
1977: Comme sur des roulettes - Himself
1980: Mon oncle d'Amérique - Jean Le Gall
1981: Camera d'albergo - Tonino Accrocca
1983: Le braconnier de Dieu - M. Martin
1998: Bingo - Monsieur Schmitt
2005: Olé! - M. Sonnier
2009: Wild Grass - Marcel Schwer

Director and actor
1956: La Vie est belle - Life is Beautiful Roger

References

External links

New York Times on Roger Pierre

iFrance (in French)
paroles.net (in French)

1923 births
2010 deaths
Deaths from cancer in France
French male film actors
French humorists
French male television actors
Male actors from Paris
French male writers